Arnsdorf is a municipality in the district of Bautzen, in Saxony, Germany.

Arnsdorf (b Dresden) railway station is located in the southern part of the village and located at Görlitz–Dresden and Kamenz–Pirna railway lines.

References 

 
Municipalities in Saxony
Populated places in Bautzen (district)